Imperial Blue, abbreviated to IB and also known as Seagram's Imperial Blue, is a brand of Indian whisky, owned by Pernod Ricard, and launched in 1997. It is a blend of Indian grain spirits with imported Scotch malts. It is commonly available in 750ml, 375ml and 180ml bottles, and also available in 90ml bottles.

History
Imperial Blue was launched in India in 1997 by Seagram. Seagram's global business was jointly acquired by Pernod Ricard and Diageo on 21 December 2001. Pernod Ricard bought Seagram's Indian operations in 2002. Pernod Ricard had previously entered the Indian market by acquiring a 74% stake in United Agencies Ltd (UAL), with a bottling facility in Kolhapur, Maharashtra. UAL was merged with Seagram's Indian business and continued operations under the name Seagram Manufacturing Ltd. The decision to integrate UAL into Seagram was taken due to the latter's larger operations in the country.

Marketing
Imperial Blue was relaunched in 2002, targeting males age 25–35 years with the advertising slogan "Men Will Be Men".

Advertising alcoholic beverages is banned in India as per the Cable Television Network (Regulation) Amendment Bill, which came into effect on 8 September 2000. Pernod Ricard circumvents the ban through surrogate advertising. Imperial Blue commissioned a feature-length film called Men Will Be Men in 2011, starring Rajesh Kumar, Gaurav Chopra, Rohit Khurana, Rahil Tandon, and Zeenal Kamdar.

Imperial Blue became an official sponsor of the World Series Hockey in February 2012. The brand has also sponsored music concerts in India.

Sales
The following table shows the annual sales of Imperial Blue:

References

External links
 Pernod Ricard official site
 Pernod Ricard official site Imperial Blue page

Indian whisky
Products introduced in 1997
Alcoholic drink brands